Elizabeth Rose Rebecca Watts-Russell (1833 – 7 October 1905) was a New Zealand community leader. As Elizabeth Rose Rebecca Bradshaw, she was born in Ireland in about 1833.

After her husband's death on 2 April 1875, she married his friend, Alfred Richard Creyke on 28 April 1877 at the British Embassy in Paris. After Creyke died in 1893, she arranged for the western porch of the ChristChurch Cathedral to be built in his memory. On the south side of the cathedral's nave, there is also a Watts-Russell Memorial Window. She died on 7 October 1905 at Horsham, West Sussex.

References

1833 births
1905 deaths
Irish emigrants to New Zealand (before 1923)
Canterbury Pilgrims
19th-century New Zealand people